"Termination for Cause" is the fifth episode of season two of the CBS drama Jericho. It was broadcast on March 11, 2008. The name is a business phrase meaning that an employee has been fired due to bad behavior or other specific failures.

Summary

Jake and the rangers barricade themselves in the hospital to protect Mimi, whose life is in danger because of what she knows about Goetz. They square off in a battle for survival, while one of the Rangers takes a course of action that will alter his life forever.

Plot
A flashback shows Jake and several others arriving at the Richmond farm to find Bonnie in Stanley's arms, having died protecting Mimi from Goetz. Mimi is taken to the Medical Center, unconscious. Jake orders the Rangers to the Medical Center to protect Mimi. He tries to persuade Beck and his men to help them, but they are headed for New Bern. Beck warns Jake not to take any action against Goetz.

At the farm, Goetz destroys Mimi's evidence against him, then takes his men to the Medical Centre for Mimi. Jake and the Rangers have barricaded themselves inside. Goetz demands to see Mimi, but Jake refuses. The situation becomes a standoff, and Goetz calls for back-up from Ravenwood. Goetz has the power to the Medical Center disconnected. Eric and Stanley learn that Gary’s wife has been brought to the scene by Ravenwood. Jake allows Gary to leave, and the Rangers realize that Ravenwood is taking their families hostage to force an end to the standoff.

Hawkins returns home to find two Ravenwood men, who ask him to come to the hospital. Hawkins kills one and holds the other at gunpoint. He takes the Ravenwood uniform from the dead man and brings his hostage to the Medical Center. He has the Rangers let him and the hostage in, suggesting they use him as leverage if Ravenwood continues to threaten their families. Goetz hears that his two men are missing, and calls Fred, one of the Rangers guarding the Medical Center, which Emily sees.

Hawkins and Jake ask Mimi why Goetz wanted her dead. Mimi reveals she has evidence of Goetz embezzling from Ravenwood. She recreates the evidence from J&R's records, then sends the evidence to J&R. Jimmy informs Jake that their Ravenwood hostage has escaped. As the man couldn't have escaped without help, Jake realizes these is a traitor among them. Emily tells them about the phone call that she saw Fred receive earlier. They realize Fred is the traitor and decide to use him to feed false information to Goetz.

Hawkins and Jake search the building for their escaped hostage, recapturing him after a firefight. Jake and Hawkins tell Fred that the hostage is still at large, and ask him to guard the back door. Fred allows the Ravenwood contractors to enter the building, but they find the entire Medical Center empty and believe that the Rangers have escaped to regroup at Stanley's farm. Fred discovers that the Rangers were hiding in the Medical Center's basement. In an attempt to redeem himself, Fred tells Jake that Goetz and his men are heading for a nearby crossroads to await reinforcements.

The next morning, the Rangers wait near the crossroads. Senior Ravenwood officials arrive, confront Goetz about the embezzlement, and fire him. The new Ravenwood arrivals leave with Goetz's vehicles, leaving him and his men to walk back to town. Once the Ravenwood party leaves, Jake and the Rangers ambush Goetz and his men, prompting a firefight. Russell and his men from New Bern arrive and join in. Goetz surrenders, and Jake and Russell argue over who will take custody of him. Stanley arrives and shoots Goetz in the head, killing him in revenge for Bonnie. Jake eventually agrees to let Russell's men take the body back to New Bern, where Beck finds his body hung from a tree.

Reception
Geoff Berkshire at the LA Times commented on the death of Goetz: "I'm not big on the whole vengeance-killings-in-entertainment concept, but last night's Jericho made it work, thanks to the sensitive performance of series regular Brad Beyer (as Stanley) and the loathsome turn from recurring guest D.B. Sweeney (as Goetz).... The entire sequence was the dramatic high point of the hour, but it wasn't overblown with excessive music or melodramatic tears or shouting."

References

External links
 "Termination for Cause" at CBS.com

2008 American television episodes
Jericho (2006 TV series) episodes